The International School of Kraków (ISK) – a school in Lusina, Lesser Poland Voivodeship in southern Poland, belonging to the Polish Embassy of United States.

The ISK was established in 1993 in the heart of Kraków. The school was founded as the American International School of Kraków (AISK) then later changed its name to the International School of Kraków (ISK). In 2006, the school moved to a new campus in Lusina with funding assistance from the United States Embassy in Poland. The school belongs to the Central and Eastern European Schools Association and competes with schools throughout Central and Eastern Europe. It is accredited by the Council of International Schools and the New England Association of Schools and Colleges. Since 2012, ISK provides the IB Diploma Programme for high school students, and is one of four schools in Kraków to do so. 
ISK is housed on an enclosed 1.25 hectare campus in the quiet suburb of Lusina, approximately 20 minutes from the city center. There are landscaped areas with park benches, basketball courts and a soccer field. ISK features a spacious library, large multi-purpose hall, covered sports facility, and computer lab; wireless Internet access is available throughout the campus.

External links

 School website
 Director's welcome
 PTA page
 International Baccalaureate Organisation website
 Council of International Schools website
 Central & Eastern European Schools Association website
 New England Association of Schools and Colleges website

Kraków County
International schools in Poland
International Baccalaureate schools in Poland
Educational institutions established in 1993
1993 establishments in Poland